Marko Kantele (born 24 August 1968 in Mäntyharju) is a Finnish darts player.

Career

Kantele made his major debut in the 1997 Winmau World Masters, beating defending champion Colin Monk in the first round but lost in the second round to Mark Day. He returned to the Masters five years later, losing in the second round to Ted Hankey. Kantele made a third appearance at the Masters, beating Bobby George and Remco van Eijden to reach the last 16 where he lost to Martin Atkins. He also played in the 2004 World Darts Trophy, losing in the first round to Robert Wagner.

Kantele qualified for the 2005 BDO World Darts Championship, beating Tony O'Shea in the first round before losing in the second round to Simon Whitlock. He also played in the International Darts League the same year, winning his opening group game against Mario Robbe but lost to Raymond van Barneveld and Atkins, eliminating him from the group stages. He also played in the 2005 World Darts Trophy, but lost in the first round to Vincent van der Voort. Kantele reached the last 32 of the 2006 World Masters and reached the last 32, losing to Darryl Fitton. Kantele reached the quarter finals of the 2007 WDF World Cup but failed to qualify for the World Championship.

Kantele won the PDC World Finland Qualifying Event, beating Asko Niskala in the final. The win earned him a spot in the 2009 PDC World Darts Championship and made him Finland's first ever representative. He beat Lourence Ilagan 5–2 in legs in the preliminary round, but lost 3–1 in sets to Ronnie Baxter in the first round.  Afterwards, Kantele began playing in PDC Europe events competing for the European Order of Merit.

Kantele represented Finland with Petri Korte in the 2012 PDC World Cup of Darts and together they were beaten 4–5 by Croatia in the first round. His best result in the rest of 2012 was in reaching the semi-finals of a Scandinavian tour event in Finland where he lost 1–6 to Ulf Ceder. He finished 11th on the SDC Order of Merit. In January 2013 he entered the PDC's Q School to try and earn a two-year tour card but he finished joint 95th having played all four days with his best result being a last 64 defeat. In September, Kantele lost in the final of the Sawo Open to Veijo Viinikka.

In the second Swedish event on the 2014 Scandinavian Pro Tour, Kantele won the title by defeating Jarkko Komula 6–4. He also reached the final of the Nordic Cup, but lost 4–2 against Daniel Larsson. Kantele played in his first World Cup since 2012 in 2015 and first with Kim Viljanen and they were beaten 5–4 by South Africa in the opening round with Kantele missing one match dart. He won the final event on the 2015 Scandinavian Darts Corporation Pro Tour by edging past Magnus Caris 6–5.

Kantele and Viljanen lost 5–1 in the first round of the 2016 World Cup to Wales. In 2017 Viljanen missed two match darts in the first round as they were knocked out 5–4 by Wales.

By finishing second on the 2019 European Q-School Order of Merit, he earned a PDC Tour Card for 2019–2020.

World Championship results

BDO

2005: Second round (lost to Simon Whitlock 1–3)

PDC

2009: First round (lost to Ronnie Baxter 1–3)
2018: First round (lost to John Henderson 0–3)
2020: First round (lost to William O'Connor 0–3)
2021: First round (lost to John Henderson 2–3)

Performance timeline

PDC

BDO

PDC European Tour

References

External links

1968 births
People from Mäntyharju
Finnish darts players
Living people
Professional Darts Corporation former tour card holders
PDC World Cup of Darts Finnish team
Sportspeople from South Savo